Dyschirius sextoni is a species of ground beetle in the subfamily Scaritinae. It was described by Bousquet in 1987.

References

sextoni
Beetles described in 1987